Golden North is an Australian ice cream maker headquartered in Laura, South Australia, and has been in business since 1923.

History
Starting as a dairy farm operated by the Bowker family, the business took on ice-making to keep its scalded milk fresh in the hot climate as it expanded its sales territory to Broken Hill in New South Wales.
The Golden North brand was adopted in 1948. The business was acquired by Farmers Union in 1972, then in 1991, it became a subsidiary of National Foods. In 2001, a group of South Australian investors brought the business back under local private ownership. In 2006, they expanded their plant. Their flavours include a distinctive honey ice cream. Besides manufacturing ice cream under the Golden North brand, they make generic brand ice cream for sale in supermarkets.

See also

South Australian food and drink

References

External links
Entry at The Encyclopedia of South Australian Culture
Australian Broadcasting Corporation South Australian Country Hour report on 2006-04-11
South Australian 2006 Heritage Icon Award

Food and drink companies established in 1923
Products introduced in 1923
Australian companies established in 1923
Australian cuisine
Ice cream brands
Companies based in South Australia
Ice cream parlors
Dairy products companies of Australia